Clone is the fourth studio album by the British progressive metal band Threshold, released in 1998. It is the first album with the long time singer Andrew "Mac" McDermott and the final one with the drummer Mark Heaney. In October 2012, Nuclear Blast released a "Definitive Edition", including three bonus tracks.

The album also comes closer than any other by the band to presenting a loose storyline through its songs, describing how the genetic manipulation of humans leads to the development of telepathy, and how these enhanced humans leave the earth to colonize other planets, eventually returning to Earth centuries later.

The UK Planet Rock DJ Darren Redick appears on the introduction to the song "Goodbye Mother Earth".

Track listing

Personnel 
Andrew "Mac" McDermott – lead vocals
Karl Groom – guitar/acoustic
Nick Midson – guitar/acoustic
Jon Jeary – bass guitar
Richard West – keyboards
Mark Heaney – drums
Definitive edition bonus tracks:
Johanne James – drums

1998 albums
Threshold (band) albums
Albums produced by Karl Groom
Concept albums